Hypseocharis is a genus of flowering plants belonging to the family Geraniaceae.

Its native range is Peru to Northwestern Argentina.

Species:

Hypseocharis bilobata 
Hypseocharis malpasensis 
Hypseocharis pedicularifolia 
Hypseocharis pilgeri 
Hypseocharis pimpinellifolia 
Hypseocharis tridentata

References

Geraniaceae
Geraniales genera